The men's qualification for football tournament at the 1965 All-Africa Games.

Qualification

Zone I (North Africa)

|}

Algeria qualified; Libya and Morocco withdrew the qualification.

Zone II (West Africa 1)

First round

|}

Mali advanced to the second round

Second round

|}

Mali qualified.

Zone III (West Africa 2)
The tournament was held in Abidjan, Ivory Coast; Ghana was represented by the U-23 team.

Ivory Coast qualified.

Zone IV (West Africa 3)
The tournament was held in Lagos, Nigeria. 3-2-1 points system was taken.

Togo qualified.

Zone V (Central Africa)
The tournament was held in Léopoldville, Congo Léopoldville.

Congo Léopoldville qualified; in addition, Congo qualified as hosts.

Zone VI (East Africa)
The tournament was held in Kampala, Uganda.

Congo Léopoldville qualified.

Zone VII (Southern Africa)
The tournament was held in Dar El Salam, Tanzania. Burundi, Malawi, Rwanda and Zambia withdrew.

Madagascar qualified.

Qualified teams
The following countries have qualified for the final tournament:

External links
African Games 1965 - Rec.Sport.Soccer Statistics Foundation

1965